Come into Our World is a studio album by the girl group The Emotions issued in October 1979 on ARC/Columbia Records. The album rose to No. 35 on the US Billboard Top Soul Albums chart and No. 36 on the UK Blues & Soul British Soul Albums chart. Come into Our World was also produced by Maurice White who went on to be Grammy nominated in the category of Producer of the Year Non-Classical.

Overview
Come into Our World was produced by Maurice White. Artists such as David Foster and Ricky Lawson of The Yellowjackets also appeared upon the album.

Critical reception

Phyl Garland of Stereo Review proclaimed that the LP was "made up of the sort of briskly invigorating and tuneful songs that reach right out and grab your ear". Garland added " Still, though White may well be the Svengali behind this trio of Trilbys, none of his magic would work if it were not for the energy and polish supplied and applied by the Emotions."
Jon Wall of Melody Maker noted that "throughout Come into Our World The Emotions' superb vocal control, range and harmonic sense are displayed to maximum effect". He also proclaimed that "Come into Our World is one of the most appealing albums I've heard since Off the Wall. I can't get the album off the turntable and I don't want to". Fred Murphy of Variety called the LP "a slick smooth production and a refreshing change of material for the group." Bill Rhedon of The Baltimore Sun found that "Like many of the 'Sound of Chicago' groups, the Emotions don't rely on audio gimmicks or super-polished stage presence for their success. Their only 'secrets' are great songwriters, who provide three sopranos with excellent material, and their musicians. Beyond that it's simply steady, unvarying 'Coming at You, Soul'. The nice thing about the Emotions on record is their consistent and even performance."

Maurice White, the album's producer, also went on to be Grammy nominated in the category of Producer of the Year Non-Classical.

Singles
"What's the Name of Your Love?" rose to No. 30 on the Billboard Hot R&B Songs chart. I Should Be Dancing also reached No. 41 on the Dutch Pop Singles chart.

Track listing

Personnel
The Emotions
 Sheila Hutchinson – vocals
 Wanda Hutchinson – vocals
 Jeanette Hutchinson – vocals

Musicians
 Verdine White, Charles "Chuck-A-Luck" Hosch, Keni M. Burke  – bass 
 Wayne Vaughn, David Foster, David Paich, Gary Glenn, Tennyson Stevens – keyboards
 Roland Bautista, Marlo Henderson – guitars
 Fred White, Ricky Lawson, Steve Ferrone, Leon "Ndugu" Chancler – drums, syndrums, percussion
 Rahmlee Michael Davis, Bobby Bryant, Elmer Brown, Nolan A. Smith, Steve Madaio – trumpets
 Don Myrick, Fred Jackson, Jerome Richardson, Bill Greene– saxophones
 Paulinho da Costa – percussion
 Dorothy Jeanne Ashby – harp
 Alan Robinson, Marilyn Robinson – French horn
 Louis Satterfield, Garnett Brown, Lew McCreary, Maurice Spears – trombone
 Bernard Kundell, Carl LaMagna, David Frisina, David Montagu, Don Palmer, Endre Granat, Enro Neufeld, Frank Foster, Gina Kronstadt, Haim Shtrum, Harris Goldman, Harry Bluestone, Henry Ferber, Henry L. Roth, Ilkka Talvi, Israel Baker, Jack Gootkin, Janice Gower, Jerome Reisler, Jerome Webster, Joseph Goodman, Joy Lyle, Karen Jones, Lya Stern, Marcy Dicterow, Mari Botnick Tsumura, Mark Cargill, Marshall Sasson, Marvin Limonick, Nathan Ross, Norman Car, Pam Gates, Paul Shure, Pavel Farkas, Robert Lipsett, Ron Clark, Ronald Folsom, Tibor Zlig, Bill Henderson – violin
 Allan Harshman, David Schwartz, Gareth Nuttycombe, Herschel Wise, Jan Hlinka, James Ross, Linda Lipsett, Marilyn Baker, Myron Sadler, Patrick Morgan, Virginia Majewski, William Hymanson – viola
 Barbara H. Badgley, Daniel Rothmuller, Edgar Listgarten, Harry Schultz, Jacqueline Lustgarten, Julianna Buffum, Larry Corbett, Miguel Martinez, Ray Kramer, Robert L. Adcock, Ronald Cooper – cello
 Tom Tom 84 (Thomas Washington), Ben Wright, Greg Mathieson, Wade Marcus - arranger
Technical
Engineered by George Massenburg, Mic Guzauski, Tom Perry
Produced for Kalimba Productions
Recorded at: Hollywood Sound Recorders, Davlen Sound Studios and Sound City Studios, Los Angeles, CA
Mastered at The Mastering Lab

Charts

References

1979 albums
Columbia Records albums
ARC Records albums
The Emotions albums
Albums arranged by Wade Marcus
Albums produced by Maurice White
Albums recorded at Sound City Studios